Renato Ricci is a human name from Italian language or culture, may refer to:
 Renato Ricci, was an Italian fascist politician
 Renato Ricci (Italian footballer), an Italian association footballer
 Renato Ricci (Australian footballer), an Australian Australian-rule footballer

See also
 Renato, a given name
 Ricci, a surname